Tagliacarne Guglielmo (31 May 1893 in Orta San Giulio, Novara, Italy – 10 April 1979 in Rome, Italy) was an Italian statistician

Biography
Guglielmo Tagliacarne was born in Orta San Giulio, Novara, on May 31, 1893. He studied at the Bocconi University, Milan, obtaining a master's degree in Economics. He carried on his statistical studies analyzing supply chains, buying and consumption behaviors, demographic and occupational trends and the provincial and regional calculation of National Income.

He was awarded an honour for his fights during the 1st World War. In 1922 he started his lessons about Statistics and Social Science Methodology at the Human Society School for the application of cooperation, welfare service and social legislation. In October 1925 he introduced a memoir on International Disaster Statistics at the International congress of Statistics in Rome. In the 1930s he studied Internal Trade for the General Confederation of Trade.

He had to fight again as an Officer during the 2nd World War, and was imprisoned in India by the English. During his captivity he taught Economics and Statistics to fellow pow's. Post War 1946, he researched the Italian Industry situation for the Ministry of Reconstruction. In the following years (1947/1968) he became Secretary-general for the Chamber of Commerce in Milan. At the meantime he was in charge of the newly constituted (1947) Italian Union of Chambers of Commerce, leading the role that he covered for more than 20 years.

He was University Professor of Statistics and Demographics in Italian Universities (Milan, Rome, Pavia, Macerata and Pisa) and International Universities (Caracas and Lima). He died in Rome on April 10, 1979. Seven years later the “Guglielmo Tagliacarne” Institute came to life, a foundation for research and training for the development of Economic culture, whose research projects are still taking inspiration from the illustrious researchers works.

Research Interests
Market Research. Provincial and regional calculation of National Income. Consumer and Supply Chain interaction. Commercial Dealers behaviour. Demographic and Occupational trend.

Education
Master's degree in Economic Sciences obtained in 1920 at Bocconi University in Milan.

Academic Positions
University Professor of Statistics and Demographics.

Honours,Awards
In 1986 a foundation of research and training of the Italian Union of Chambers of Commerce was entitled “Guglielmo Tagliacarne Institute”.

Known for
Founder of the Italian Association for Market Studies (AISM) and of the School of Economic Development, now Master Tagliacarne of Economic Development. Welfare and Economic-Productive Activity Indicators regarding territorial specificity.

Students
Luigi Pieraccioni, one of his students and co-founder of Tagliacarne Institute, developed his researches gaining a deep understanding from data analysis.

Publications
 Scritti di economia e statistica, 1938, Stab. tipografico de “La Gazzetta dello sport”, Milano, XVII, a cura dei funzionari e impiegati dell‟Unione fascista dei commercianti della provincia di Milano;
 Demografia dell'India: Studio di Demografia di Comparata, 1949, Studi Monografie della Società taliana di Demografia e Statistica, N. 1, Roma;
 Tecnica e pratica delle ricerche di mercato, 1951, Giuffrè Editore, Milano, 4 ed. (1964);
 Variazioni territoriali dello stato economico tra il 1938 e il 1952 in Italia e in altri Paesi, 1954, Studi e Monografie della Società Italiana di Economia Demografia e Statistica, N. 7;
 Lo studio delle aree di mercato in Italia, 1957, Giuffrè Editore, Milano;
 Barometro economico, 1963–1966, in Rassegna economica, Napoli, Banco di Naloli;
 260 aree economiche in Italia. Contributo alla programmazione, 1966, Giuffrè Editore, Milano;
 Direzione dei Periodici: Sintesi economica (dal 1948) e Studi di mercato (dal 1955).

Link
http://www.tagliacarne.it/
https://sites.google.com/site/dizionariosis/poster-statistici/tagliacarne-gugliemo

Italian statisticians
1893 births
1979 deaths
People from Orta San Giulio